Rhodopseudomonas faecalis is a gram-negative, anaerobic, phototroph bacteria from the genus of Rhodopseudomonas with a polar flagella which was isolated from chicken faeces.

References

External links
Type strain of Rhodopseudomonas faecalis at BacDive -  the Bacterial Diversity Metadatabase

Nitrobacteraceae
Bacteria described in 2002